Ludwik Hass (1918–2008) was a Polish historian who specialised in the history of Freemasonry in Poland.

Hass was born to Jewish parents in Stanisławow. He was brought up in a middle-class family which had been assimilated to Polish nationalism. He attended the University of Lviv, which was then in the territory of the Polish Second Republic. While there he became a Trotskyist. Following the German-Soviet invasion of Poland in 1939 he found himself in the territory of the Soviet Union. He was arrested and sent to Vorkutlag. He attributed his survival due to being assigned office work thanks to his education. He was released in 1948 and remained in the Soviet Union until he returned to Poland in 1957. On his arrival in Warsaw he astounded a welcoming delegation of students, by announcing that he was a revolutionary who wanted to overthrow the bureaucracy. He then sang The Internationale and gave a clenched fist salute.

External links
 You tube video of his funeral

texts
 The Russian Masonic Movement in the Years 1906 - 1918, (1983) Acta Poloniae Historica 48,

References

1918 births
2008 deaths
20th-century Polish historians
Polish male non-fiction writers
Polish deportees to Soviet Union
Polish Trotskyists
Writers from Ivano-Frankivsk
University of Lviv alumni